This article presents a list of the historical events and publications of Australian literature during 1909.

Books 

 Arthur H. Adams – Galahad Jones
 Louis Becke 
 The Adventures of Louis Blake
  'Neath Austral Skies
 Randolph Bedford – Sops of Wine
 Albert Dorrington and A. G. Stephens – The Lady Calphurnia Royal
 Miles Franklin – Some Everyday Folk and Dawn
 Louise Mack 
 The Red Rose of a Summer
 Theodora's Husband
 Rosa Praed – A Summer Wreath
 Ethel Turner – Fugitives from Fortune
 Lilian Turner – The Perry Girls

Short stories

 Erle Cox – "The Social Code"
 Dulcie Deamer – "Hallowe'en"
 Henry Lawson – "Roll Up at Talbragar"
 Rosa Praed – "The Bushman's Love Story"
 Steele Rudd
 From Selection to City
 Stocking Our Selection

Poetry 

 William Baylebridge – Australia to England: And Other Verses
 C. J. Dennis 
 "Doreen"
 "The Stoush O' Day"
 George Essex Evans – "Queensland: Queen of the North: A Jubilee Ode"
 Mabel Forrest – Alpha Centauri
 Hugh McCrae – Satyrs & Sunlight: Silvarum Libri
 John Shaw Neilson 
 "Heart of Spring!"
 "May"
 "The Smoker Parrot"
 "The Soldier is Home"
 Bertram Stevens – The Golden Treasury of Australian Verse (ed.)

Births 

A list, ordered by date of birth (and, if the date is either unspecified or repeated, ordered alphabetically by surname) of births in 1909 of Australian literary figures, authors of written works or literature-related individuals follows, including year of death.

 28 January – Beatrice Davis, editor and critic (died 1992)
 20 June – Errol Flynn, actor and writer (died 1959)
 26 June – Mavis Thorpe Clark, writer for children (died 1999)
 11 December – Ronald McKie, novelist (died 1991)

Unknown date
 Joyce Dingwell, novelist (died 1997)

Deaths 

A list, ordered by date of death (and, if the date is either unspecified or repeated, ordered alphabetically by surname) of deaths in 1909 of Australian literary figures, authors of written works or literature-related individuals follows, including year of birth.

 10 November – George Essex Evans, poet (born 1863)
 28 November – W. T. Goodge, poet (born 1862)

See also 
 1909 in poetry
 List of years in literature
 List of years in Australian literature
 1909 in literature
 1908 in Australian literature
 1909 in Australia
 1910 in Australian literature

References

Literature
Australian literature by year
20th-century Australian literature